The World Federation of International Music Competitions (WFIMC) is an organization based in Geneva, Switzerland that maintains a network of the internationally recognized organisations that aim to discover the most promising young talents in classical music through public competition. It was founded in 1957, and now 120 of the world's leading music competitions are members of the federation.

Member organizations by year of membership

1950s

1957 (Founding members)
  ARD International Music Competition, Munich
  Budapest International Music Competition, (Cello, Conducting & Piano) Franz Liszt International Piano Competition, Budapest
  Ferruccio Busoni International Piano Competition, Bolzano
  Frédéric Chopin International Piano Competition, Warsaw
  Geneva International Music Competition, Geneva
  Gian Battista Viotti International Music Competition, Vercelli
  Henryk Wieniawski International Violin Competition, Poznań
  Marguerite Long – Jacques Thibaud International Piano and Violin Competition, Paris
  Niccolò Paganini International Violin Competition, Genoa
  Prague Spring International Music Festival
  Queen Elisabeth International Music Competition, Brussels

1958
  Maria Canals International Piano Competition, Barcelona
  Besançon International Competition for Young Conductors
  International Beethoven Piano Competition Vienna
  International singing competition of Toulouse

1959
  International Vocal Competition 's-Hertogenbosch

1960s

1961
  Robert Schumann International Competition for Pianists and Singers, Zwickau

1963
  Accademia Nazionale di Santa Cecilia International Composition Competition, Rome

1965
  Johann Sebastian Bach International Music Competition, Leipzig
  Leeds International Piano Competition

1968
  José Vianna da Motta International Piano Competition, Lisbon

1969
  Carl Flesch International Violin Competition, London (last held in 1992)
  Jean Sibelius International Violin Competition, Helsinki

1970s

1971
  Piotr Ilyich Tchaikovsky International Music Competition (piano, violin, cello, singing), Moscow (retracted in 2022)

1973
  Grand Prix de Chartres

1974
  Jeunesses Musicales International Music Competition, Belgrade

1975
  Alessandro Casagrande International Piano Competition, Terni
  Arthur Rubinstein International Piano Master Competition, Tel Aviv
  Grand Prix Maria Callas, Athens

1976
  Alberto Curci International Violin Competition, Naples
  Clara Haskil International Piano Competition, Vevey
  Paloma O'Shea International Piano Competition, Santander
  Sion International Violin Competition
  Tibor Varga International Violin Competition, Martigny
  Verdian Voices International Singing Competition, Busseto

1977
  Van Cliburn International Piano Competition, Fort Worth

1978
  Sydney International Piano Competition
  Vaclav Huml International Violin Competition, Zagreb

1979
  Épinal International Piano Competition

1980s

1980
  Fritz Kreisler International Violin Competition, Vienna
  The Grzegorz Fitelberg International Competition for Conductors, Katowice
  London String Quartet Competition
  Ludwig Spohr International Violin Competition, Freiburg
  William Kapell International Piano Competition, College Park

1981
  Bordeaux International String Quartet Competition
  Carl Nielsen International Music Competition (violin, organ, flute, clarinet), Odense
  Cleveland International Piano Competition
  Dr. Luis Sigall International Music Competition (piano, violin, cello, guitar, singing), Viña del Mar
  Michele Pittaluga International Classical Guitar Competition, Alessandria

1982
  Verviers International Singing Competition

1983
  Francisco Viñas International Singing Competition, Barcelona
  Gina Bachauer International Piano Competition, Salt Lake City

1984
 Banff International String Quartet Competition, Banff, Alberta
  International Violin Competition of Indianapolis
  Vittorio Gui International Chamber Music Competition, Florence

1985
  Rodolfo Lipizer International Violin Competition, Gorizia
  Premio Valentino Bucchi, Rome

1986
  Arturo Toscanini – Goffredo Petrassi International Conducting and Composition Competition, Parma
  Francisco Tárrega International Guitar Competition, Benicàssim

1987
  Géza Anda International Piano Competition, Zürich 
  Kobe International Flute Competition
  Mirjam Helin International Singing CompetitionHelsinki
  Pilar Bayona International Piano Competition, Zaragoza (disbanded after the 2001 edition)

1988
  Bilbao International Singing Competition
  Cologne International Music Competition (violin, piano, singing)

1989
  Dublin International Piano Competition

1990s

1990
  Franz Schubert and Modern Music International Music Competition, Graz
  Trapani International Chamber Music Competition
  USA International Harp Competition, Bloomington
  Wolfgang Amadeus Mozart International Music Competition, Salzburg

1991
  Paolo Borciani International String Quartet Competition, Reggio Emilia 
  UNISA International Music Competition, Pretoria

1992
  Cidade do Porto International Piano Competition
  International Franz Liszt Piano Competition, Utrecht
  Odense International Organ Competition

1993
  Antonio Pedretti International Conducting Competition, Trento
  José Iturbi International Piano Competition, Valencia
  Leopold Mozart International Violin Competition, Augsburg
  Markneukirchen International Instrumental Competition
  Queen Sonja International Music Competition, Oslo

1994
  Mikalojus Konstantinas Ciurlionis International Piano and Organ Competition, Vilnius
  Scottish International Piano Competition, Glasgow

1995
  Calgary International Organ Competition
  Dos Hermanas International Clarinet Competition
  Julián Gayarre – Pablo Sarasate International Singing and Violin Competition, Pamplona
  Provincia di Caltanissetta International Chamber Music Competition
  International Joseph Joachim Violin Competition, Hannover

1996
  Città di Porcia International Music Competition (brass instruments)
  "Ciutat de Tarragona" International Award for Musical Composition
  Franz Schubert International Piano Competition, Dortmund
  Melbourne International Chamber Music Competition

1997
  Jan Nepomuk Hummel International Piano Competition, Bratislava
  Marseille International Opera Competition
  Murray Dranoff International Two Piano Competition, Miami
  Orléans International Piano Competition
  Osaka International Chamber Music Competition
  Sergei Prokofiev International Music Competition, Saint Petersburg

1998
  Honens International Piano Competition, Calgary
  Hamamatsu International Piano Competition
  Trio di Trieste International Chamber Music Competition

2000s

2000
  Ville de Paris International Music Competition
  Witold Lutoslawski International Cello Competition, Warsaw

2001
  Alexander Girardi International Singing Competition, Coburg
  Luxembourg International Percussion Competition

2002
  George Enescu International Piano Competition, Bucharest
  London International Piano Competition
  Tbilisi International Piano Competition

2003
  Musashino-Tokyo International Organ Competition
  Mt. Fuji International Opera Competition of Shizuoka, Hamamatsu

2004
  Cadaqués Orchestra International Conducting Competition
  International Competition for Young Pianists in Memory of Vladimir Horowitz, Kyiv
  Montreal International Musical Competition (piano, violin, singing)
  Premio Jaén International Piano Competition
  Michael Hill International Violin Competition, Auckland

2005
  Città di Brescia International Violin Competition
  Sendai International Music Competition (violin, piano)
  Weimar International Music Competition (Franz Liszt – piano, Joseph Joachim – chamber music)

2006
  Isang Yun Competition, Tongyeong 
  Lyon International Chamber Music Competition
  Pablo Casals International Cello Competitionm Kronberg
  Saint-Maurice International Organ Competition

2007
  China International Piano Competition, Xiamen
  EPTA – Svetislav Stančić International Piano Competition, Zagreb
  TROMP International Music Competition, Eindhoven

2008
  Max Rostal International Viola and Violin Competition, Berlin
  Swedish International Duo Competition, Katrineholm

2009
  China International Singing Competition, Ningbo
  China International Violin Competition, Qingdao
  Jeju International Brass Competition
  Maj Lind International Piano Competition, Helsinki
  Rina Sala Gallo International Piano Competition, Monza
  Seoul International Music Competition (piano, violin, singing), Seoul
  Telekom – Ludwig van Beethoven International Piano Competition, Bonn
  Wilhelm Stenhammar International Music Competition (for singers), Norrköping

2010s

2010
  Paderewski International Piano Competition, Bydgoszcz
  Beijing International Music Competition, Beijing
  Gaspar Cassado International Violoncello Competition, Hachioji

2011
  Veronica Dunne International Singing Competition, Dublin
  The Aeolus International Competition for Wind Instruments, Düsseldorf
  International Oboe Competition of Japan, Karuizawa
  International Chamber Music Competition "Città di Pinerolo", Pinerolo
  BNDES International Piano Competition, Rio de Janeiro
  International Competition of Young Conductors Lovro von Matačić, Zagreb

2012
  International Violin Competition Henri Marteau, Lichtenberg and Hof
  International J. M. Sperger Competition for Double Bass, Ludwigslust
  Trondheim International Chamber Music Competition, Trondheim
  RNCM James Mottram International Piano Competition, Manchester

2013
  Aram Khachaturian International Competition, Yerevan

2014
  Tokyo International Music Competition for Conducting, Tokyo

2015
  International Grand Prix of Romania ”Trophaeum Artis Cantorum”, Bucharest
  China Shenzhen International Piano Concerto Competition, Shenzhen
 Takamatsu International Piano Competition, Takamatsu
  Top of the World International Piano Competition, Tromsø

2016
  Hong Kong International Piano Competition, Hong Kong
  Canadian International Organ Competition, Montreal
  Elena Obraztsova International Competition of Young Opera Singers, St Petersburg
  Giorgos Thymis International Piano Competition, Thessaloniki

2017
  International Edvard Grieg Piano Competition, Bergen
  Schoenfeld International String Competition, Harbin
  International Piano Competition - Istanbul Orchestra'Sion, Istanbul
  Longwood Gardens International Organ Competition, Kennett Square
  Primrose International Viola Competition, Los Angeles
  Princess Astrid International Music Competition, Trondheim

2018
  Gustav Mahler Conducting Competition, Bamberg
  Zhuhai International Mozart Competition, Zhuhai
  The Gurwitz International Piano Competition, Texas

2019
  International Luciano Berio Composition Competition, Rome
  Shanghai Isaac Stern International Violin Competition, Shanghai
  Singapore International Violin Competition, Singapore
  Éva Marton International Singing Competition, Budapest
  International Stanisław Moniuszko Vocal Competition (Międzynarodowy Konkurs Wokalny im. Stanisława Moniuszki), Warsaw

2020s

2020
  The Girolamo Fantini Intertnational Trumpet Competition, Rome
  Debut International Classical Singing Competition, Weikersheim

2021
  DHF World Harp Competition, Utrecht
  The Azrelli Music Prizes, Toronto
  Santa Cecilia Piano Competition, Porto

2022
  Concurso Internacional de Piano Compositores de España (CIPCE), Las Rozas de Madrid
  International Ettore Pozzoli Piano Competition, Seregno
  Odesa International Violin Competition, Odesa
  Ipea International Percussion Competition, Shanghai
  Olga Kern International Piano Competition, Albuquerque

See also
 List of classical music competitions

References

External links
 World Federation of International Music Competitions
 Piano Competitions & Music Competitions at Bakitone International

International music organizations
Organisations based in Geneva
1957 establishments in Switzerland